Armand Cupree "Cap" Tyson (February 10, 1903 – March 28, 1973) was an American baseball catcher in the Negro leagues. He played with the Birmingham Black Barons in 1938, 1940, and 1941.

References

External links
 and Seamheads

Birmingham Black Barons players
1903 births
1973 deaths
20th-century African-American sportspeople
Baseball catchers